Rolf Holmberg (24 August 1914 – 5 July 1979) was a Norwegian association football player who competed in the 1936 Summer Olympics. He was a member of the Norwegian team, which won the bronze medal in the football tournament.

He also took part in the 1938 FIFA World Cup.

References

External links
 profile

1914 births
1979 deaths
Norwegian footballers
Footballers at the 1936 Summer Olympics
Olympic footballers of Norway
Olympic bronze medalists for Norway
Norway international footballers
1938 FIFA World Cup players
Odds BK players
Olympic medalists in football
Medalists at the 1936 Summer Olympics
Association football midfielders